Piano Sonata No. 29 may refer to:

Piano Sonata No. 29 (Beethoven), known as the "Hammerklavier"
Piano Sonata No. 29 (Tveitt)